Onhan is a regional Western Bisayan language spoken, along with the Romblomanon and Asi languages, in the province of Romblon, Philippines. The language is also known as Inunhan and Loocnon.
 
Specifically, Onhan is spoken on the following islands within Romblon:

Tablas: the municipalities of San Andres, Santa Maria, Alcantara, Ferrol, Looc, and Santa Fe and some upland sitios in Odiongan,.
Carabao: the sole municipality of San Jose.

As a variant of the Kinaray-a language, some speakers are found on the island of Boracay in Aklan province as well as parts of the island of Panay, specifically in the following municipalities: Malay, Nabas and Buruanga. In the provinces of Oriental and Occidental Mindoro, migrant Onhan speakers from Tablas Island brought the language to the following municipalities: San Jose, Magsaysay, Bulalacao, Mansalay, Roxas, and some parts of Bongabong. As such, it is very much related to Kinaray-a and Kuyonon.

Grammar

Pronouns

Numbers

Literature
The New Testament was translated into Bisaya-Inunhan by Eldon Leano Talamisan and published in 1999.

The Harrow, an official publication of Romblon State University, publishes Inunhan poems, stories and other genres of literature.

References

Languages of Romblon
Visayan languages